is a Japanese manga series written and illustrated by Yukiko Gotō. It was serialized in Shogakukan's seinen manga magazines Monthly Big Comic Spirits (2009–2010) and Weekly Big Comic Spirits (2010–2011), with its chapters collected in five tankōbon volumes.

Publication
The manga was transferred to Weekly Big Comic Spirits on July 5, 2010; an additional chapter was published in Monthly Big Comic Spirits on September 27, 2010. The series finished on November 28, 2011. Shogakukan collected its chapters in five tankōbon volumes, released from September 30, 2010, to January 30, 2012.

Volume list

See also
Phobia, another manga series illustrated by Yukiko Gotō

References

External links
 

Comedy anime and manga
Seinen manga
Shogakukan manga
Slice of life anime and manga